João Pinheiro is a municipality in, Minas Gerais, Brazil.

João Pinheiro can also refer to:
João de Deus Pinheiro (born 1945), Portuguese politician
João Pinheiro Chagas (1863–1925), Portuguese journalist and politician
João Carlos Batista Pinheiro (1932–2011), Brazilian footballer
João Pinheiro (referee) (born 1988), Portuguese football referee

See also 
João Pinheiro Foundation in Brazil